Devil in the Brain  is a 1972 Italian psychological thriller movie.

Plot 
Oscar Minno returns from working several years overseas and looks up his old flame Sandra. Sandra is widowed and lives in a childlike mental state on her family's estate, cared for by the overprotective Countess de Blanc. Sandra's son, Ricky, is suspected of having killed his father, Fabrizio, as well as a vagrant trespassing on the estate. Ricky is then sent to a reform school run by nuns. Oscar's doctor friend believes that Ricky is mentally fit and begins to suspect that there is much more to the story.

Cast 
Keir Dullea as Oscar Minno
Stefania Sandrelli as Sandra Garces
Micheline Presle as Countess Claudia Osorio De Blanc
Maurice Ronet as Fabrizio Garces
Tino Buazzelli as Doctor Emilio Bontempi
Renato Cestiè as Ricky Garces
Orchidea de Santis as Caterina
Gaia Germani as Bianca Molteni

See also   
 List of Italian films of 1972

References

External links

1972 films
Italian mystery thriller films
1970s mystery films
Films directed by Sergio Sollima
Films scored by Ennio Morricone
1970s psychological thriller films
Films with screenplays by Suso Cecchi d'Amico
1970s Italian-language films
1970s Italian films